John Dudley Fishburn (born 8 June 1946) is a British businessman, journalist, and politician. He was Executive Editor of The Economist and Member of Parliament of the United Kingdom (MP) for Kensington.

Early life and family
Educated at Eton and Harvard College, from which he graduated in American history and literature and was a member of the Harvard Lampoon, he has an honorary Doctorate from the Open University and the University of Reading. He was married to Victoria Boles, who served as High Sheriff of Berkshire in 2016, a daughter of Sir Jack Boles and sister of one-time Conservative MP Nick Boles, by whom he has four children. Alice, the eldest, works as a journalist on the Financial Times; Honor was an assistant at Downing Street, having been David Cameron's diary secretary.

Business career
Fishburn is the chairman of Bluecube Technology Solutions Ltd, and Mulvaney Capital Management Ltd. He is on the board of GFI Group, the European subsidiary of a Wall Street broker, BGC. He once was a Director of  Altria Inc, then one of America's ten biggest companies. He was also on the board of Philip Morris International Inc, and of HSBC Bank plc, Beazley Group plc, and Saatchi and Saatchi plc.

Not-for-profit organisations
Fishburn has a long connection with universities on both sides of the Atlantic.  He was chairman of the Trustees of the Open University Foundation. He was the first Englishman to be elected to Harvard University's governing board, the Board of Overseers and served on the Council of Reading University and as a Trustee of the Foundation for Liver Research, which is affiliated to the University of London. He chaired the Visiting Committee of the Cambridge University Library.

For 10 years he chaired the committee for the foremost private library and research system, that of Harvard University's schools and faculties. He won the Harvard Alumni award for this work. Fishburn served of the advisory board of the Centre for the Advanced Study of India at the University of Pennsylvania.

Fishburn is currently Chairman of the Governors of Theale Green Academy, a school for 1,100 students in Theale, Berkshire, sponsored by Bradfield College.

Dudley Fishburn has worked for heritage organisations. He is currently chairman of the Heritage of London Trust and chairs the Friends of the Silchester Archaeological Dig. For 10 years he was on the Executive Committee of the National Trust and was the National Trust's Treasurer. Fishburn recently retired as Deputy Chairman of the Peabody Housing Trust. He is an advisor to the Parasol Charitable Trust.

Politics and journalism

In the 1970s, Fishburn twice stood unsuccessfully for Parliament for the Isle of Wight. He was elected to the House of Commons, as the MP for Kensington, in a by-election in 1988 and re-elected in 1992. In 1997, he stepped down claiming  "there were too many MPs" and has since campaigned for a reduction in the size of the House of Commons.

In Parliament, he made his name campaigning for leasehold reform which led, after much resistance, to the Leasehold Reform Act. He was made "Radical of the Year" in 1990. Fishburn also brought to the Statute Book a private bill that permitted qualified nurses to write prescriptions, thus breaking the doctors’ monopoly. Fishburn served as Parliamentary Private Secretary to Sir Timothy Sainsbury in the Foreign and Commonwealth Office and the Department of Trade.

During his terms in Parliament, he continued as Associate Editor of The Economist producing 13 annual editions of its publication The World in..., which is published in 15 languages. He has been published in The New York Times and  The Times. He is now President of the Newbury Conservative Association; the Member of Parliament for Newbury is Laura Farris.

References

External links
 

1946 births
Living people
Conservative Party (UK) MPs for English constituencies
UK MPs 1987–1992
UK MPs 1992–1997
People educated at Eton College
Harvard College alumni